Medical Academy for Science and Technology, also referred to as MAST Academy @ Homestead, is a secondary magnet school located in Homestead, Florida. It opened for the 2010-2011 school year as a few classrooms in Campbell Middle School (renamed Center For International Education: A Cambridge Associate School in 2014), then moved into the then-closed Homestead Medical Hospital in 2011.

The school's former and founding principal was Gregory Zawyer. Its current principal is Lisa Noffo, a former MDCPS PE teacher, taking the position in 2014.

Acceptance at MAST Academy @ Homestead is done via random selection process, along with a prerequisite of taking Algebra in 8th grade from a local middle school. The school provides classes for students who are interested in becoming a part of the medical field, and the basic category of classes are Honors classes.

Magnet programs
Biomedical
Pharmaceutical
Physical Therapy
iMed

Notable AP programs
AP Biology
AP English Literature and Composition
AP Environmental Science
AP European History
AP Government and Politics: Comparative
AP Government and Politics: United States
AP Capstone
AP European History
AP United States History
AP World History

See also
MAST Academy
Miami-Dade County Public Schools

References

External links
MAST Academy @ Homestead
School Profile

Magnet schools in Florida
Public high schools in Florida
Miami-Dade County Public Schools
Homestead, Florida
Educational institutions established in 2010
2010 establishments in Florida